Diocese of Portsmouth may refer to:

 Anglican Diocese of Portsmouth
 Roman Catholic Diocese of Portsmouth